Patrick Gasienica (born 28 November 1998) is an American Ski jumper. He competed in the 2022 Winter Olympics.

Personal life
He was born in the United States to a family of Polish immigrants from Zakopane.

References

External links

1998 births
Living people
American male ski jumpers
Ski jumpers at the 2022 Winter Olympics
Olympic ski jumpers of the United States
Sportspeople from Illinois
American people of Polish descent